Chiniot General Hospital (CGH) located in  Korangi Town, Karachi, Pakistan is a project of Chiniot Anjuman Islamia.

Recognized hospital 
Chiniot General Hospital, Karachi is recognized by the College of Physicians and Surgeons of Pakistan.

Overview
Chiniot Anjuman Islamia is a registered general welfare organization founded in 1983, it is managed by some industrialists and businessmen belonging to the Shaikh baradari of Chiniot. Most notably, Qaiser Ahmed Sheikh is one of the founders.

References

External links
Chiniot General Hospital, Korangi, Karachi website 

Hospitals in Karachi
1983 establishments in Pakistan